Admiral Leveson may refer to:

Arthur Leveson (1868–1929), British Royal Navy admiral
Richard Leveson (admiral) (c. 1570–1605), English vice admiral
John Leveson-Gower (Royal Navy officer)
Edward Leveson-Gower